Ziener is a surname. Notable people with the surname include:

Bruno Ziener (1870–1941), German actor and film director
Gunhild Ziener (1868–1937), Norwegian politician
Manny Ziener (1887–1972), German actress

See also
Ziegner
Zierer (surname)